Colin Garland (born 28 April 1988) is a former professional Australian rules footballer who played for the Melbourne Football Club in the Australian Football League (AFL).

Beginning his playing years at the North Hobart in the SFL in Tasmania, Garland was recruited by the Demons from the TAC Cup side Tassie Mariners at pick No. 46 in the 2006 AFL Draft.

Playing for the Demons as an athletic key position player, Garland wore the No. 20 guernsey. He became the first player since the late Troy Broadbridge to wear this jumper, after it was retired for the previous two years (2005–2006).

Garland received a NAB Rising Star nomination (round 14, 2008) for his consistent efforts playing in the Demons backline.

Garland announced his retirement from the game on 19 October 2017, after missing the entire season due to a knee injury.

Garland returned to his former club North Hobart during the 2018 TSL season.

Garland has also played and been an assistant coach at the Clarence Football Club in the TSL.

Statistics
 Statistics are correct to the end of the 2017 season

|- style="background-color: #EAEAEA"
! scope="row" style="text-align:center" | 2007
|
| 20 || 2 || 0 || 1 || 3 || 6 || 9 || 1 || 3 || 0.0 || 0.5 || 1.5 || 3.0 || 4.5 || 0.5 || 1.5
|-
! scope="row" style="text-align:center" | 2008
|
| 20 || 17 || 2 || 1 || 120 || 84 || 204 || 76 || 23 || 0.1 || 0.1 || 7.1 || 4.9 || 12.0 || 4.5 || 1.4
|- style="background:#eaeaea;"
! scope="row" style="text-align:center" | 2009
|
| 20 || 1 || 0 || 0 || 12 || 7 || 19 || 5 || 3 || 0.0 || 0.0 || 12.0 || 7.0 || 19.0 || 5.0 || 3.0
|-
! scope="row" style="text-align:center" | 2010
|
| 20 || 20 || 1 || 0 || 174 || 121 || 295 || 73 || 66 || 0.1 || 0.0 || 8.7 || 6.1 || 14.8 || 3.7 || 3.3
|- style="background:#eaeaea;"
! scope="row" style="text-align:center" | 2011
|
| 20 || 18 || 1 || 1 || 167 || 100 || 267 || 74 || 42 || 0.1 || 0.1 || 9.3 || 5.6 || 14.8 || 4.1 || 2.3
|-
! scope="row" style="text-align:center" | 2012
|
| 20 || 22 || 8 || 6 || 203 || 78 || 281 || 98 || 73 || 0.4 || 0.3 || 9.2 || 3.5 || 12.8 || 4.5 || 3.3
|- style="background:#eaeaea;"
! scope="row" style="text-align:center" | 2013
|
| 20 || 21 || 2 || 1 || 221 || 108 || 329 || 89 || 76 || 0.1 || 0.0 || 10.5 || 5.1 || 15.7 || 4.2 || 3.6
|-
! scope="row" style="text-align:center" | 2014
|
| 20 || 14 || 1 || 2 || 125 || 54 || 179 || 59 || 43 || 0.1 || 0.1 || 8.9 || 3.9 || 12.8 || 4.2 || 3.1
|- style="background:#eaeaea;"
! scope="row" style="text-align:center" | 2015
|
| 20 || 20 || 1 || 2 || 194 || 85 || 279 || 83 || 85 || 0.1 || 0.1 || 9.7 || 4.3 || 14.0 || 4.2 || 4.3
|-
! scope="row" style="text-align:center" | 2016
|
| 20 || 6 || 0 || 0 || 36 || 31 || 67 || 19 || 19 || 0.0 || 0.0 || 6.0 || 5.2 || 11.2 || 3.2 || 3.2
|- style="background:#eaeaea;"
! scope="row" style="text-align:center" | 2017
|
| 20 || 0 || – || – || – || – || – || – || – || – || – || – || – || – || – || –
|- class="sortbottom"
! colspan=3| Career
! 141
! 16
! 14
! 1255
! 674
! 1929
! 577
! 416
! 0.1
! 0.1
! 8.9
! 4.8
! 13.7
! 4.1
! 3.0
|}

References

External links

 
 

Melbourne Football Club players
1988 births
Living people
Australian rules footballers from Tasmania
Tassie Mariners players
Casey Demons players
North Hobart Football Club players
Clarence Football Club players